Taymouth may refer to:

Places
 Taymouth, New Brunswick, Canada
 Taymouth Castle, Scotland
 Taymouth Township, Michigan, United States

Manuscripts
 Taymouth Hours, an illuminated book of Hours produced in England in about 1325–40